Self-Made Maids is a 1950 short subject directed by Jules White starring American slapstick comedy team The Three Stooges (Moe Howard, Larry Fine and Shemp Howard). It is the 124th entry in the series released by Columbia Pictures starring the comedians, who released 190 shorts for the studio between 1934 and 1959.

Plot
The Stooges are artists who fall in love with three models, Larraine, Moella and Shempetta. The short begins with the three models getting ready for their portrait sitting. After they are finished, they do not want to be late, and begin to skip out of the door. Larraine and Shempetta crash into the wall while Moella falls into the next room. At the studio, the Stooges accidentally ruin each other's work, but calm down when the models arrive. The models agree to the Stooges' proposals, and they go to ask their father for their hands in marriage. The Stooges bump into the models' father, but do not know his identity. He gets mad at them, but the Stooges get even with their usual style. The models' father later denies their proposal request when he recognizes them as the "hoodlums" who accosted him earlier. After a wild chase around the house, the Stooges catch him, and tickle his feet until he changes his mind. Eventually, he agrees, and the boys marry their girls. Later, all three couples finally have a baby of their own.

Cast
 Moe Howard as Moe, Moella, Father, Mergatroyd
 Larry Fine as Larry, Larraine, Baby Doll and Lady in art
 Shemp Howard as Shemp, Shempette, Junior and Mustache man in art
 Teddy Mangean as Man in Lobby (uncredited)

Production notes
Self-Made Maids was filmed on March 14–17, 1949. It is one of two Stooge films that does not have a supporting cast, the other being 1958's Oil's Well That Ends Well. The boys all play themselves, a second character in drag, and their children. Moe also plays the girls' father, while Shemp and Larry appear briefly as a couple in a painting.

Moe’s high heel slipped while skipping (in the opening scene), resulting in a sprained ankle. Rather than ruining the take, Moe hopped into the next room to get out of the camera view, tossing his purse in order to use both of his hands to break his fall onto the bed. Moe tripped over the bed, and hit his head on the bed leg, knocking him out. Moe arrived on the set the following day on crutches.

References

External links 
 
 

1950 films
1950 comedy films
The Three Stooges films
American black-and-white films
Films directed by Jules White
Columbia Pictures short films
American comedy short films
1950s English-language films
1950s American films